Nikko Allen Jenkins (sometimes spelled Nicholas on first name; born September 16, 1986) is an American spree killer convicted of committing four murders in Omaha, Nebraska, in August 2013. The murders occurred within a month after he had been released from prison after serving 10-and-a-half years of the 18 years to which he had been sentenced for a carjacking committed at age 15 and for assaults committed in prison. Jenkins stated that he had committed the killings at the command of the ancient serpent god Apophis. He was found competent to stand trial, found guilty of the four murders, and was sentenced to death in May 2017.

Early years 
Jenkins was born in Colorado to parents David A. Magee and Lori Jenkins. Jenkins began a criminal record at age 7 when he was charged with bringing a gun to school.

Murders 
At about 5:01 a.m. on August 11, 2013, a patrol officer discovered two bodies in a white Ford pickup truck parked near a city swimming pool at 18th and F St, in Spring Lake Park. The two victims, identified as Juan Uribe-Pena and Jorge C. Cajiga-Ruiz, had been shot in the head, and their pockets turned inside out. They were lured to meet two women for a sexual encounter. The murder spree began with this random double-murder less than two weeks after his release from prison on July 30.

On August 19, around 7 a.m., the body of Curtis Bradford was found outside a detached garage at 18th and Clark St. by a man returning home from a night shift at a convenience store. Investigators arrived to find two bullet wounds in Bradford's back. It was later revealed that Bradford and Jenkins had posed for a Facebook photo posted the day before. Bradford would be the only victim familiar to Jenkins.

Jenkins' fourth and final victim, Andrea Kruger, was discovered on August 21, at about 2:15 a.m., by a deputy sheriff responding to a shots-fired call. Her body was found lying in the road at 168th and Fort St., with multiple 12-gauge shotgun wounds to the face, neck, and shoulder. Kruger had been returning home after a bartending shift near 178th, and Pacific St. Surveillance footage showed her locking up the Deja Vu Lounge at 1:47 a.m.

Victims

Arrest 
On August 30, 2013, Jenkins was arrested on an unrelated terroristic threats charge. By then, the evidence against him had mounted—investigators had the image of a female associate on surveillance footage at a local gun outlet buying the kind of distinctive ammunition (Brenneke Classic Magnum 12-gauge, commonly known as "deer slugs") that had been used to commit the killings. Additional footage had been pulled from cameras along the route to Kruger's abandoned SUV. On the evening of September 3, Jenkins confessed to all four murders during a rambling 8-hour interview. Jenkins told police that the acts were sacrifices to Apophis, a deity in the ancient Egyptian religion. He was charged with four counts of murder following the confession.

Trial 

In handwritten letters dated November 3, 2013, submitted to the Omaha World-Herald, prosecutors, and a judge, Jenkins said he wished to plead guilty to all counts in the four slayings and that he would protect Apophis' kingdom with "animalistic savage brutality."

On February 19, 2014, Jenkins filed a federal lawsuit seeking $24.5 million from the State of Nebraska for wrongfully releasing him from prison. He stated that his claims of hearing voices from Apophis were repeatedly ignored. In the six-page handwritten filing, he stated that being kept in solitary confinement augmented his schizophrenia. He blamed corrections officials for the four killings. Jenkins claimed that his problems were caused by mental illness, and that he had schizophrenia, bipolar disorder, and obsessive-compulsive disorder. The judge ordered a psychiatric evaluation, and a psychiatrist concluded that Jenkins had antisocial personality disorder and was faking psychotic symptoms.

After being declared competent to stand trial (Jenkins scored 68 on an administered IQ test), the proceedings against Jenkins commenced. On his request, Jenkins was allowed to represent himself at trial under the guidance of advisory attorneys. Throughout the trial, Jenkins maintained that he acts under the command of Apophis. His courtroom antics included speaking in tongues, howling, and laughing as prosecutors recounted the details of his victims' deaths. On April 16, 2014, Judge Peter Bataillon found Nikko Jenkins guilty of all four murders.

Jenkins was initially scheduled to be sentenced on August 11, 2014. The date was delayed indefinitely following a hearing held to determine whether he was capable of understanding the death penalty proceedings against him. On July 29, Judge Bataillon ordered Jenkins to be housed at the Lincoln Regional Center psychiatric hospital until doctors were satisfied with his condition. Officials at the Regional Center refused to house Jenkins due to inadequate security, but doctors agreed to treat him at a Lincoln prison.

In May 2017, Jenkins was sentenced to death by a three-judge panel. He was also sentenced to 450 years on weapons charges connected with the murders.

On April 20, 2020, the US Supreme Court refused to hear his appeal.

See also 
 Capital punishment in Nebraska
 List of death row inmates in Nebraska

References

External links 
 Ombudsman report
 Nebraska Department of Correctional Services: Inmate Details

1986 births
Living people
2013 murders in the United States
21st-century American criminals
American male criminals
American people convicted of murder
American prisoners sentenced to death
American spree killers
Crime in Nebraska
Crimes in Omaha, Nebraska
Criminals from Colorado
Criminals from Nebraska
Male murderers
People convicted of murder by Nebraska
People with antisocial personality disorder
People with intellectual disability
Prisoners sentenced to death by Nebraska